Harry C. Leinweber (January 6, 1907 – March 19, 1992) was a politician from Alberta, Canada. He served in the Legislative Assembly of Alberta from 1961 to 1971 as a member of the Social Credit Party.

Political career
Leinweber served as a municipal Alderman for the city of Medicine Hat from 1944 to 1950.  He ran for mayor twice but was unsuccessful.

Leinweber first ran for a seat to the Alberta legislature in a by-election held on January 19, 1961, in the electoral district of Medicine Hat. He defeated three other candidates with just under half the popular vote to hold the district for Social Credit.

In the 1963 general election Leinweber was re-elected with over 51% of the popular vote over three other candidates.

In the 1967 general election Leinweber won the district with just 40% of the popular vote over future MLA Jim Horsman. He retired from the Legislature at dissolution in 1971.

References

External links
Legislative Assembly of Alberta Members Listing

1907 births
Alberta Social Credit Party MLAs
1992 deaths
Insurance underwriters
Emigrants from the Russian Empire to Canada
Alberta municipal councillors
People from Medicine Hat